HTML Tidy is a console application for correcting invalid HyperText Markup Language (HTML), detecting potential web accessibility errors, and for improving the layout and indent style of the resulting markup. It is also a cross-platform library for computer applications that provides HTML Tidy's features.

History
HTML Tidy was developed by Dave Raggett of the World Wide Web Consortium (W3C). Later it was released as a SourceForge project in 2003 and managed by various maintainers.

In 2012, the project was moved to GitHub, and maintained by Michael Smith, also of W3C, where HTML5 support was added.

In 2015, the HTML Tidy Advocacy Community Group (HTACG) was formed for management and development of HTML Tidy as a W3C Community Group.

HTML Tidy source code is written in ANSI C for portability. Compiled binary files are available for a variety of platforms. It is available under the W3C Software Notice and License, a permissive BSD-style license. Up-to-date versions are available as source code cloned from its GitHub Git version control repository, or in binary packages for multiple operating systems from its GitHub Releases repository.

Features

Examples of corrections to invalid or poorly constructed HTML:
 Reorder mixed-up tags
 Complete missing or mismatched end tags
 Add missing syntax elements (some tags, quotes, etc.)
 Report proprietary HTML extensions
 Change layout of markup to a predefined style
 Transform characters from some encodings into HTML entities

See also

 Comparison of HTML parsers
 CSSTidy

References

External links
 HTML Tidy Project Page
 Current Source Code
 Official Binary Releases
 HTML Tidy Project Page (legacy)
 HTML Tidy service Was an online version of HTML Tidy at the W3C. The W3C online tidy service was decommissioned on 29 November, 2017.

Free software programmed in C
HTML editors
Software using the W3C license